Vincent Pichel (born 12 November 2001) is a Dutch football player. He plays as a central midfielder for Cambuur.

Club career
Pichel made his Eredivisie debut for Cambuur on 21 January 2023 in a game against Sparta Rotterdam.

References

External links
 

2001 births
Living people
Dutch footballers
Association football midfielders
SC Cambuur players
Eredivisie players